The 1977 Miami Hurricanes football team represented the University of Miami as an independent during the 1977 NCAA Division I football season. Led by first-year head coach Lou Saban, the Hurricanes played their home games at the Miami Orange Bowl in Miami, Florida. Miami finished the season with a record of 3–8.

Schedule

Roster

Season summary

Georgia Tech

References

Miami
Miami Hurricanes football seasons
Miami Hurricanes football